Azinger is a German-language surname. Azinger has its origins at the manor of Azing, near the city Eggenfelden in Bavaria, Germany. Notable people with the surname include:

Mike Azinger (born 1965), American politician
Paul Azinger (born 1960), American professional golfer and TV golf analyst
Tom Azinger (born 1935), American politician

References

See also 

 Asinger reaction
 Avinger, Texas
 Wasinger
 Zinger

Surnames of German origin
German-language surnames